Convent of Santa Fe is a former monastery situated in Toledo, Spain. It is situated in the north-east of the historic centre of the city. 
Included in the heritage listing Bien de Interés Cultural, it has been protected since 30 September 1919.

It is built on ancient Muslim ruins.

Bibliography

References

Roman Catholic churches in Toledo, Spain
Bien de Interés Cultural landmarks in the City of Toledo